Kaavya Arivumani is an Indian actress who works in Tamil language television and films.

Career 
In 2019, Kaavya started her career in Bharathi Kannamma serial as Kaavyaa, Soundarya's niece. One year later, Kaavya had replaced Mullai (replacement of V. J. Chitra after her demise on Dec 2020). Kaavya had started her first innings with film with Bharath movie named Miral (2022) produced by Axess film factory. Kaavya got an opportunity working with director Arun Karthik in the movie Ripubury (2022).

Filmography

Serial

References 

Year of birth missing (living people)
Living people
Tamil actresses
21st-century Indian actresses
Tamil television actresses
Actresses in Tamil television